The 1969–70 NBA season was the Rockets' 3rd season in the NBA.

Offseason

Draft picks

Roster

Regular season

Season standings

Record vs. opponents

Game log

References

Houston Rockets seasons
San Diego